Bumpin' may refer to:

 Bumpin' (Wes Montgomery album), 1965
 ''Bumpin''' (Dis-n-Dat album), 1994

See also
 Bumping (disambiguation)